The 2022–23 season is Al-Tai's 24th non-consecutive season in the Pro League and their 62nd season in existence. The club will participate in the Pro League and the King Cup.

The season covers the period from 1 July 2022 to 30 June 2023.

Players

Squad information

Out on loan

Transfers and loans

Transfers in

Loans in

Transfers out

Loans out

Pre-season

Competitions

Overview

Goalscorers

Last Updated: 16 March 2023

Assists

Last Updated: 11 March 2023

Clean sheets

Last Updated: 10 February 2023

References

Tai